The Immortals of Terra: A Perry Rhodan Adventure is a 2008 adventure game.

Critical reception
The game has a rating of 63% on Metacritic based on 16 critic scores.

Game Chronicles said " At the end of my adventure, I found The Immortals of Terra to be a highly enjoyably title. While I may not have had a real connection to the main character, I came off with a better understanding of why the Perryverse has lasted this long. " Eurogamer wrote " It's one of the richest, most cohesive entries in the point-and-click genre I've seen for a long time, and I'm a little sad that it didn't come out fifteen years ago. Just think of all the sequels we could've had by now. " Adventure Gamers wrote " It's an auspicious debut that should appeal to sci-fi adventure fans, even if you’re not familiar with the American astronaut and his “Perryverse”. " Cheat Code Central said " A pleasant surprise. The gameplay could use a little spice (some form of combat or other elements would liven things up nicely), but it's an impressive game - both visually and in terms of the expansive sci-fi universe laid out before you. " Gamers' Temple wrote " It has all of the prerequisites for an amazing game: good graphics, strong fiction to draw upon, and an interesting plot. Unfortunately it stumbles in its execution of gameplay, and not because it tries to hard to do something new. "  Just Adventure wrote " As adventure games go, it is almost a sci-fi opus and it is intriguing to think that only a minuscule portion of the Perryverse has been plumbed. " GamingNexus said " A soupy ending cinematic can't drag down this intimately-crafted homage to German sci-fi staple (but American unknown), Perry Rhodan. "

PC Gamer wrote " With the set pieces all working this well, it's a shame Immortals features such a forgettable plot with so few appealing characters." PC Zone UK said it was "An above-average sci-fi adventure, but if you're fond of rollercoasters, join a different queue. " Level7.nu said " This is a typical game of point and click, detailing the world of Rhodan and the angel-like Illochim. Some issues with graphics and dialogue mar what is otherwise quite a decent adventure. If you're not a fan of Perry Rhodan chance is that you won't find this game all that intriguing. " Gamezone wrote " Only the most die-hard fans of the Perry Rhodan series will truly love this game. Others looking for a well-thought out and engaging adventure may want to look elsewhere. " IGN said " This adventure is only recommended for hardcore fans of the genre who don't mind zany logistical puzzles; otherwise, you should beam yourself the hell out of there. " GameSpot said " Even an innovative sci-fi setting can't save the illogical and boring Immortals of Terra. " Gaming Experience said " Immortals is not a game that I would choose to play in order to relax or pass the time in the airport. " PC Gamer UK wrote the game was "Stuffy science fiction nonsense without a scrap of humour." GameShark wrote " Like all games based on successful licenses from the written world, it’s a shame to see Immortals of Terra struggle so much in terms of overall direction. I’m sure in the vast Perry Rhodan landscape there’s more than enough material to make several blockbuster titles, yet this game fails to even make it out of the starting block. "

References

2008 video games
Adventure games
Point-and-click adventure games
Video games based on novels
Video games developed in Germany
Windows games
Windows-only games
Viva Media games